Diclonius (meaning "double sprout") is a genus of dinosaur from the Late Cretaceous. It was a hadrosaur based solely on teeth. Its fossils were found in the Judith River Formation of Montana, northern US. The name is in reference to the method of tooth replacement, in which newly erupting replacement teeth could be in functional use at the same time as older, more worn teeth. Thus, the number of "sprouting" teeth was doubled in comparison to Monoclonius ("single sprout"), which used only one set of teeth at a time and which Cope named in the same paper.

The type species, Diclonius pentagonus, was named by Edward Drinker Cope in 1876, based on a single tooth specimen (AMNH 3972). Other formally undescribed species include D. calamarius and D. perangulatus. Although Cope referred several other batches of teeth to the genus, under several species, the name is considered a nomen dubium.

Species
Type:
D. pentagonus Cope, 1876 (type); fragmentary dentary with teeth, nomen dubium

Formerly referred Species:
D. calamarius Cope, 1876; teeth, nomen dubium
D. mirabilis (Leidy, 1856) Cope, 1883; junior synonym of Trachodon mirabilis
D. perangulatus Cope, 1876; teeth, nomen dubium

See also

 Timeline of hadrosaur research

References

E. D. Cope. 1876. Descriptions of some vertebrate remains from the Fort Union Beds of Montana. Proceedings of the Academy of Natural Sciences of Philadelphia 28:248-261
Cope, E. D. 1883. The structure and appearance of the Laramie dinosaurian. American Naturalist 37:774-777.
Coombs, W. 1988. The status of the dinosaurian genus Diclonius and the taxonomic utility of hadrosaurian teeth. Journal of Paleontology 62:812-817.

Hadrosaurs
Late Cretaceous dinosaurs of North America
Nomina dubia
Taxa named by Edward Drinker Cope
Paleontology in Montana
Campanian genus first appearances
Campanian genus extinctions
Ornithischian genera